The 1990–91 Montana Grizzlies basketball team represented the University of Montana during the 1990–91 NCAA Division I basketball season. The Grizzlies were led by fifth-year head coach Stew Morrill and played their home games on campus at Adams Fieldhouse in Missoula, Montana.

They finished the regular season at 21–7, with a  record in conference to win the regular season title. The Grizzlies earned an automatic berth in the NCAA tournament by winning the Big Sky Conference tournament.

In the opening round of the NCAA Tournament at McKale Center in Tucson, Arizona, Montana faced the top-ranked, defending national champion UNLV Runnin' Rebels. Jerry Tarkanian's UNLV squad entered the game with a 30–0 mark on the season and, dating back to the previous season, a 41–game winning streak overall and wins in 51 of their previous 52 games. The Grizzlies were beaten soundly, 99–65.

Postseason results

|-
!colspan=9 style=| Big Sky tournament

|-
!colspan=9 style=| NCAA tournament

References

External links
Sports Reference – Montana Grizzlies: 1990–91 basketball season

Montana Grizzlies basketball seasons
Montana
Montana